Effia-Kwesimintsim Municipal District is one of the fourteen districts in Western Region, Ghana. Originally it was formerly part of the then-larger Sekondi Takoradi Metropolitan District on 29 February 2008, until the western part of the district was split off to create Effia-Kwesimintsim Municipal District on 15 March 2018; thus the remaining part has been retained as Sekondi Takoradi Metropolitan District. The municipality is located in the southeast part of Western Region and has Kwesimintsim as its capital town.

Sources

References

Districts of the Western Region (Ghana)

2018 establishments in Ghana